Ronnie McDowell is an American country music artist. His discography consists of 23 studio albums and 51 singles. Of his 51 singles, 34 charted on the U.S. Billboard Hot Country Songs charts between 1977 and 1990. McDowell also has two songs that cracked the Hot 100, most notably 1977's "The King Is Gone."

Studio albums

1970s

1980s

1990s and 2000s

Compilation albums

Live albums

Singles

1970s

1980s

1990s and 2000s

Charted B-sides

Notes
A^ "The King Is Gone" also peaked at number 16 on the RPM Top Singles chart and at number 4 on the RPM Adult Contemporary Tracks chart in Canada.

References

Country music discographies
Discographies of American artists